Dina Azar (born July 4, 1973) is a Lebanese beauty queen who was elected Miss Lebanon 1995.

Career
Dina Azar holds a BA degree in English literature from the American University of Beirut and during a sabbatical year attended the American University of Paris to further study Comparative Literature and Finance. Moreover, she attended New York Film Academy and The Art Students League of New York.

Later on, she started a career in TV in which she hosted Celebrity Duets on LBC, Mahatat on Al Arabiya, Assraruha on Dubai TV, and high-profile pan Arab Events. As well as starring in Ramad w Meleh a pan Arab TV series.

She was elected as Miss Lebanon in 1995, and has been the face of major brands in the Middle East such as Evian, Lux, and was involved in several high-profile launches alongside celebrities such as Cindy Crawford and others. She owned and designed her own Label of exquisite jewelry named after her.

She currently anchors shows on Dounia Dina, a pan Arab video based website.

Personal life 
Azar is single following a brief marriage that lasted for just a few months in 2012, that ended in a quick and difficult divorce from her ex-husband who lived in the U.S.

References 

1973 births
Living people
Lebanese female models
Jewellery designers
Lebanese beauty pageant winners
Lebanese Christians